Antonio Carlos Moretti Bermudez (born 9 February 1956 in Santo Ângelo) is a Brazilian military, Lieutenant-Brigadier of the Air, former Commander of the Brazilian Air Force. Bermudez became Commander in January 2019, replacing Nivaldo Rossato.

Personal life
Born in Santo Ângelo, in the state of Rio Grande do Sul, Bermudez is married to Eliana Ferreira and they have 3 children: Gabriel, Laís and André. His parents are Hyppólito Antonio Vijande Bermudez and Anna Maria Moretti Bermudez.

Dates of rank

References

1956 births
Living people
People from Rio Grande do Sul
Brazilian Air Force personnel
Brazilian military personnel
Brazilian Air Force generals